John Barrington may refer to:

John Barrington (14th century MP), MP for Essex
John Barrington (MP) (1624–?), English politician
Sir John Barrington, 3rd Baronet (1605–1683), English MP for Newtown, 1645–1648 and 1660–1679
Sir John Barrington, 4th Baronet (1670–1691), of the Barrington baronets
Sir John Barrington, 6th Baronet ( 1673–1717), of the Barrington baronets
Sir John Barrington, 7th Baronet (c. 1707–1776), British MP for Newtown, 1729–1734 and 1741–1775
Sir John Barrington, 9th Baronet (1752–1818), British MP for Newtown, 1780–1796
John Barrington, 1st Viscount Barrington (1678–1734), English lawyer and theologian
John Barrington (British Army officer) (died 1764)
John Barrington (Lord Mayor of Dublin) (1824–1887), member of a Quaker merchant family, and Lord Mayor of Dublin
John S. Barrington (1920–1992), British physique photographer

See also
Barrington (disambiguation)